Events in the year 2010 in Eritrea.

Incumbents 

 President: Isaias Afewerki

Events 

 1 January – An armed skirmish occurs between the country's soldiers and the army of Ethiopia near the border town of Zalambesa, Eritrea.

Deaths

References 

 
2010s in Eritrea
Years of the 21st century in Eritrea
Eritrea
Eritrea